Path to Paradise: The Untold Story of the World Trade Center Bombing is a 1997 American television film that depicts the events surrounding the 1993 World Trade Center bombing.  The film was directed by Larry Williams and Leslie Libman.  It stars Peter Gallagher and Marcia Gay Harden, and features Andreas Katsulas as Omar Abdel-Rahman and Art Malik as Ramzi Yousef.  The film premiered on HBO in June 1997.

Plot

Cast
Peter Gallagher as John Anticev
Art Malik as Ramzi Yousef
Ned Eisenberg as Emad Salem
Marcia Gay Harden as Nancy Floyd
Paul Guilfoyle as Lou Napoli
Andreas Katsulas as Omar Abdel-Rahman
Keith Randolph Smith as Ray Williams
Sheik Mahmud-Bey as Rodney Hampton-El
Shaun Toub as El Sayyid Nosair
Mike Starr as Mahmud Abouhalima
Jeffrey DeMunn as Robert Brokaw
Allison Janney as Assistant D.A.
Mike O'Malley as Storage Facility Manager
Peter McRobbie as Male Attorney

Production
Filming occurred New Jersey and Manhattan.

Controversy
At the time, the film attracted criticism for how it depicted Arabs and Muslims. A 1997 report by The American-Arab Anti-Discrimination Committee states, "[Path to Paradise] left viewers with the distinct impression that Arabs and Muslims in general are violent terrorists who will continue to attack Americans. One of the film's clear messages was that Arab immigrants are a threat to the United States and are likely to support acts of terrorism [...] Not once did the film suggest that the overwhelming majority of Arabs and Muslims in the United States condemned the bombing and feared the backlash that it might cause on their communities."

It was scheduled for a repeat broadcast on HBO the week of the 9/11 attacks.  HBO pulled it from its schedule following the attacks.

References

External links
 

American films based on actual events
Films set in the 20th century
1997 television films
1997 films
HBO Films films
Films set in 1993
Films shot in New Jersey
Films shot in New York (state)
Films set in New York (state)
Films shot in New York City
Films set in New York City
1990s English-language films